Aaron Joshua Rosanoff (26 June 1878 in Pinsk, Russian Empire – 7 January 1943) was an American psychiatrist who studied psychosis and was closely associated with Eugenics Record Office and a member of the Eugenics Research Association.

Life and career
Born in Belarus, Rosanoff emigrated to the United States in 1891 and received an MD from Cornell in 1900. He worked as a physician at Kings Park Hospital from 1901 until 1922. From 1922 until his death in 1943, Rosanoff was a psychiatrist for the L.A. Diagnostic Clinic, and was California's State Director of Institutions and State Commissioner of Lunacy in 1933.

Closely associated with Eugenics Record Office and a member of the Eugenics Research Association, Rosanoff was a member of the American Eugenics Society Advisory council from 1923 to 1935. He was also a member of the editorial Board of the American Journal of Psychiatry. In 1905 he translated Manual of Psychiatry by Joseph Rogues de Fursac, a medical school textbook which went through several editions and from 1927 appeared only under Rosanoff's name.

Work
Rosanoff studied both the physiological and genetic factors that lead to various psychosis, and is best known for his Theory of Personality, which broke down the human personality into seven scales: Normal, Hysteroid, Manic, Depressive, Autistic, Paranoid, and Epileptoid. These scales first modelled in the Humm-Wadsworth Temperament Scale personality test in 1935. These scales were used into the 1970s, notably by Chandler McLeod, who use a modified Humm system.

References
 Barry Mehler, A History of the American Eugenics Society, Ph.D. dissertation, 1988, University of Illinois.

External links
 

1878 births
1943 deaths
American psychiatrists
American eugenicists
Cornell University alumni
People from Pinsk
People from Pinsky Uyezd
Jews from the Russian Empire
Emigrants from the Russian Empire to the United States